Marcela Kubatková (born 13 January 1971) is a Czech orienteering competitor. She received a bronze medal in the relay event at the 1993 World Orienteering Championships in West Point, together with Petra Novotná, Maria Honzová and Jana Cieslarová. In the 1995 World Championships in Detmold she again received a bronze medal in relay, with the same Czech team. She received a bronze medal with the Czechoslovakian relay team in Mariánské Lázně 1991.

References

External links

1971 births
Living people
Czech orienteers
Czechoslovak orienteers
Female orienteers
Foot orienteers
World Orienteering Championships medalists
Junior World Orienteering Championships medalists